Laura Ardissone (born 7 February 1969) is an Italian retired sprinter, which participated at the 1995 World Championships in Athletics.

Achievements

References

External links

1969 births
Living people
Italian female sprinters
World Athletics Championships athletes for Italy
Mediterranean Games silver medalists for Italy
Athletes (track and field) at the 1993 Mediterranean Games
Mediterranean Games medalists in athletics
20th-century Italian women
21st-century Italian women